McLeods is a local service district in Restigouche County, New Brunswick, Canada. In 2016, it had a population of 372 people.

History

Notable people

See also
List of communities in New Brunswick

References

Communities in Restigouche County, New Brunswick
Designated places in New Brunswick
Local service districts of Restigouche County, New Brunswick